The Central Area, commonly called the Central District or The CD, is a mostly residential district in Seattle located east of downtown and First Hill (12th Avenue and Rainier Avenue); west of Madrona, Leschi and Mt. Baker; south of Capitol Hill, and north of Rainier Valley. Historically, the Central District has been one of Seattle's most racially and ethnically diverse neighborhoods, and was once the center of Seattle's black community and a major hub of African-American businesses.

History and demographics
The culture and demographics of the Central District have changed repeatedly throughout many years.  It started out as a predominantly Jewish neighborhood. Jewish residents built Temple De Hirsch on Union Street in 1907; Temple De Hirsch Sinai on the opposite corner of the same block is a successor to that congregation; the original Temple De Hirsch is largely demolished, though some fragments remain. Other former synagogues in the neighborhood are the former Sephardic Bikur Holim synagogue (now Tolliver Temple), Herzl Congregation synagogue (now Odessa Brown Clinic), and Chevra Bikur Cholim (now Langston Hughes Performing Arts Center).

A few decades later, the Central District became a home to Japanese-Americans in Seattle. The blocks between 14th and 18th Avenues and Yesler Way and Jackson Street still retain a strong Japanese presence—Faith Bible Church, the Buddhist Church, Seattle Koyasan Church, Konko, Wisteria Park, Japanese Congregational Church, Keiro Nursing Home, and the Kawabe Memorial House. During World War II, presidential Executive Order 9066 made possible the removal of American citizens of Japanese descent from the West Coast. All Japanese residents were immediately taken out of their homes and sent to internment camps. This and many race-restricted covenants to the north and south paved the way for many African Americans to find a new home in the Central District as part of the Second Great Migration to the city in search of employment opportunities in the munitions plants during the war as well as taking advantage of the post-war economic expansion. By the 1970s, Central District became largely an African-American neighborhood and the center of the civil rights movement in Seattle. In 1970, Black people made up nearly 80% of the neighborhood's population. However, it also marked the neighborhood's decline into poverty and crime for another two decades.

In the early 21st century, several demographic trends are changing the population of the Central District again. Low-income segments of the population are moving southward toward the Rainier Valley, while more affluent residents, who might otherwise have purchased homes on Capitol Hill, Madrona, Leschi, or Mt. Baker are moving into the Central District as real estate and rental property become more expensive in the former neighborhoods and commuting times and costs make suburban areas less attractive.

Due to this market pressure, housing in the Central District is mixed, with some homes on the verge of condemnation, and others having recently undergone extensive renovation. Many condemned houses are being replaced by multi-unit townhouses and condominiums. Easy access to Interstate 5, Interstate 90, and Downtown, as well as ample street parking, also make the Central District an attractive and convenient place to live.

Despite the demographic shifts since the early 1970s, many locals still think of the Central District as a predominantly African-American area. One reason for this is that despite the decline in the African-American population, there is black history in the neighborhood. It is home to the Northwest African American Museum, The Liberty Bank Building, the historic site of the first black-owned bank in Seattle, Medgar Evers Pool, and the Second Headquarters of the Seattle Black Panther Party and The People's Wall.

During the early 1960s, the neighborhood was a hotbed for the Seattle civil rights movement. In 1963, civil rights protesters took to the streets and protested against racial discrimination. Later, they participated in a sit-in in downtown Seattle. At the same time, the Black Panther Party used the neighborhood as a staging area for their movement.

As of 2010 the total population of the Central Area is 29,868 with a population that is 59.6% White or Caucasian, 21.4% Black or African-American, 9.1% Asian, 0.6% Native American, 0.3% Pacific Islander, 3.2% from other races and 6.1% from two or more races. Hispanic or Latino of any race consisted of 7.3% of the population.

Notable residents

Ernestine Anderson
Linda Emery
Jimi Hendrix
Quincy Jones
Kyle Townsend
Bruce Lee
Rose McGowan
Brandon Roy
Isaiah Stanback
Sir Mix-a-Lot
Kip Tokuda
NoClue
DeCharlene Williams
Omari Salisbury

Transportation
The Central District's main thoroughfares includes its east boundary along Martin Luther King Jr. Way ("MLK"), its west boundaries along 12th Avenue and Rainier Avenue, and its 'main street' 23rd Avenue (north and southbound). Major east–west streets in the neighborhood include E. Union, E. Cherry, E. Jefferson, E. Yesler Way, and S. Jackson.

Public transportation
King County Metro operates several bus routes in the Central District, including Route 2, Route 3, Route 4, Route 8, Route 11, Route 12, Route 14, Route 27 and Route 48.

As part of the East Link Extension on the 2 Line, Sound Transit is adding a Link light rail stop at the south end of the Central District in Judkins Park. It is expected to open in 2024.

Public parks and greenspaces 
The Central District is home to at least 18 public parks, and community green spaces. Notable parks include: T.T. Minor Playground, Firehouse Mini Park, Garfield Playfield, Pratt Park, Dr. Blanche Lavizzo Park, Judkins Park and Playfield, Judkins Skatepark, Jimi Hendrix Park, and Sam Smith Park.

The Central District is home to 4 P-Patch Community Gardens: Immaculate P-Patch at E Columbia St & 18th Ave, Squire Park at 14th Ave & E Fir St, Climbing Water at 800 Hiawatha Pl S, and Judkins at 24th Ave S & S Norman St.

Landmarks and institutions
Landmarks and institutions

 Northwest African American Museum
 Bullitt Center
 Langston Hughes Performing Arts Center
 The Nova Project
 Washington Hall

Schools

 Garfield High School

Restaurants, Bars & Shops

 Ezell's Chicken
 DeCharlene's Beauty Salon

References

External links
 
 Central District News
 23rdandunion.org, outgrowth of a 2009 KUOW-FM/Hollow Earth Radio documentary project. See also The Corner: 23rd and Union, The Hub, KUOW News, August 26, 2009.
Seattle Photograph Collection, Central District - University of Washington Digital Collection

African-American history in Seattle
 
Historic Jewish communities in the United States